The internal slave trade in the United States, also known as the domestic slave trade, the Second Middle Passage and the interregional slave trade, involved the domestic trade of enslaved people within the United States that reallocated slaves across states during the Antebellum period.  It was most significant after 1808, when the importation of slaves was prohibited. Historians estimate that one million slaves were taken in a forced migration from the Upper South, primarily Maryland and Virginia, to the territories and then new states of the Deep South: Georgia, Alabama, Florida, Louisiana, Mississippi, Arkansas, and Texas.

Economists say that transactions in the inter-regional slave market were driven primarily by differences in the marginal productivity of labor, which were based in the relative advantage between climates for the production of staple goods. The trade was strongly influenced by the invention of the cotton gin, which made short-staple cotton profitable for cultivation across large swathes of the upland Deep South (the Black Belt). Previously the commodity was based on long-staple cotton cultivated in coastal areas and the Sea Islands.

The disparity in productivity created arbitrage opportunities for traders to exploit, and it facilitated regional specialization in labor production. Due to a lack of data, particularly with regard to slave prices, land values, and export totals for slaves, the true effects of the domestic slave trade, on both the economy of the Old South and general migration patterns of slaves into southwest territories, remain uncertain. These have served as points of contention among economic historians.

Economics 

The internal slave trade among colonies emerged in 1760 as a source of labor in early America. It is estimated that between 1790 and 1860 approximately 835,000 slaves were relocated to the American South. 

The biggest sources for the domestic slave trade were "exporting" states in the Upper South, especially Virginia and Maryland, and to a lesser extent in Delaware, Kentucky, and North Carolina. From these states most slaves were imported into the Deep South, including South Carolina, Georgia, Alabama, Mississippi, Louisiana, and Arkansas. Robert Fogel and Stanley Engerman attribute the larger proportion of the slave migration due to planters who relocated their entire slave populations to the Deep South to develop new plantations or take over existing ones.

Contributing factors

Soil exhaustion and crop changes
Historians who argue in favor of soil exhaustion as an explanation for slave importation into the Deep South posit that exporting states emerged as slave producers because of the transformation of agriculture in the Upper South. By the late 18th century, the coastal and Piedmont tobacco areas were being converted to mixed crops because of soil exhaustion and changing markets. Because of the deterioration of soil and an increase in demand for food products, states in the upper South shifted crop emphasis from tobacco to grain, which required less labor. This decreased demand left states in the Upper South with an excess supply of labor.

Land availability from Indian removal
With the forced Indian removal by the US making new lands available in the Deep South, there was much higher demand there for workers to cultivate the labor-intensive sugar cane and cotton crops. The extensive development of cotton plantations created the highest demand for labor in the Deep South.

Cotton gin 
At the same time, the invention of the cotton gin in the late 18th century transformed short-staple cotton into a profitable crop that could be grown inland in the Deep South. Settlers pushed into the South, expelling the Five Civilized Tribes and other Native American groups. The cotton market had previously been dominated by the long-staple cotton cultivated primarily on the Sea Islands and in the coastal South Carolina Lowcountry. The consequent boom in the cotton industry, coupled with the labor-intensive nature of the crop, created a need for slave labor in the Deep South that could be satisfied by excess supply further north.

The increased demand for labor in the Deep South pushed up the price of slaves in markets such as New Orleans, which became the fourth-largest city in the country based in part on profits from the slave trade and related businesses. The price differences between the Upper and Deep South created demand. Slave traders took advantage of this arbitrage opportunity by buying at lower prices in the Upper South and then selling slaves at a profit after taking or transporting them further south. Some scholars believe there was an increasing prevalence in the Upper South of "breeding" slaves for export. The proven reproductive capacity of enslaved women was advertised as selling point and a feature that increased value.

Resolve financial deficits
Although not as significant as the exportation of slaves to Deep South, farmers and land owners who needed to pay off loans increasingly used slaves as a cash substitute. This had also contributed to the growth of the internal slave trade.

Statistics
Economic historians have offered estimates for the annual revenue generated by the inter-regional slave trade for exporters that range from $3.75 to $6.7 million.

The demand for prime-aged slaves, from the ages of 15 to 30, accounted for 70 percent of the slave population relocated to the Deep South. Since the ages of slaves were often unknown by the traders themselves, physical attributes such as height often dictated demand in order to minimize asymmetric information.

Robert Fogel and Stanley Engerman estimated that the slave trade accounted for 16 percent of the relocation of enslaved African Americans, in their work Time on the Cross.  This estimate, however, was severely criticized for the extreme sensitivity of the linear function used to gather this approximation. A more recent estimate, given by Jonathan B. Pritchett, has this figure at about 50 percent, or about 835,000 slaves total between 1790-1850.

Without the inter-regional slave trade, it is possible that forced migration of slaves would have occurred naturally due to natural population pressures and the subsequent increase in land prices.  Professor Miller contends that, "it is even doubtful whether the interstate slave traffic made a net contribution to the westward flow of the population."

Breeding of slave children for sale

Gentlemen in Virginia and Maryland were quick to realize the value of young slaves, and to organize breeding of them. This was not treated as any more shameful than the breeding of calves:

Slave traders

The argument has been made that the domestic slave trade was one that resulted in "superprofits" for traders. But Jonathan Pritchett points to evidence that there were a significant number of firms engaged in the market, a relatively dense concentration of these firms, and low barriers to entry. He says that traders who were exporting slaves from the Upper South were price-taking, profit-maximizers acting in a market that achieved a long-run competitive equilibrium.

Using an admittedly limited set of data from Ulrich Phillips (includes market data from Richmond, Charleston, mid-Georgia, and Louisiana), Robert Evans Jr. estimates that the average differential between slave prices in the Upper South and Deep South markets from 1830–1835 was $232.  

Evans suggests that interstate slave traders earned a wage greater than that of an alternative profession in skilled mechanical trades. However, if slave traders possessed skills similar to those used in supervisory mechanics (e.g. skills used by a chief engineer), then slave traders received an income that was not greater than the one they would have received had they entered in an alternative profession.

Routes

The two main methods of forced transportation of the enslaved initially used were the overland method, which involved walking by foot between counties or states, and the coastwise, which transported them on ships along the Atlantic and Gulf coasts between states. The Federal Road (Creek lands) was among a few of the routes used to march slaves from the Upper South into western Georgia and Alabama, while the Natchez Trace was used to trade slaves through western Tennessee and Mississippi. After the popularization of the railroad and the steamboat by the 1840s, both became used for domestic interstate transportation of slaves to slave auction markets. From the 1840s to 1860s, Montgomery became the leading slave market in Alabama due to its connection to both the Federal Road and the Alabama River, the latter of which saw steamboats shipping slaves up the river from Mobile. In addition, as early as 1841, Southern railroad companies bought male slaves to build railroads, with at least 85 of 113 railroads in the former Confederacy having used enslaved labor for construction within and between states.

Death sentence
Slaves most feared being sold to planters in Louisiana. The state's grueling climate, with high heat and humidity, as well as the pressures of cultivating and processing the labor-intensive crops of sugar cane and cotton, resulted in harsh conditions for labor. With demand high for both commodity crops, planters and overseers were known to be physically abusive to slaves. The slaves feared being sent to Louisiana as a "death sentence".

Implications for the Old South
Irish economic theorist John Elliot Cairnes suggested in his work The Slave Power that the inter-regional slave trade was a major component in ensuring the economic vitality of the Old South.  Many economic historians, however, have since refuted the validity of this point. The general consensus seems to support Professor William L. Miller's claim that the inter-regional slave trade "did not provide the major part of the income of planters in the older states during any period."

The returns gained by traders from the sale price of slaves were offset by both the fall in the value of land, that resulted from the subsequent decrease in the marginal productivity of land, and the fall in the price of output, which occurred due to the increase in market size as given by westward expansion.  Kotlikoff suggested that the net effect of the inter-regional slave trade on the economy of the Old South was negligible, if not negative.

The profits realized through the sale and shipment of enslaved people were in turn reinvested in banking, railroads, and even colleges. A striking example of the connection between the domestic slave trade and higher education can be found in the 1838 sale of 272 slaves by the Maryland Jesuits to Louisiana; a small portion of the proceeds of the sale was used to pay down the debts of Georgetown College.

See also

Slave Trade Acts
Slave pen
Coffle
Treatment of the enslaved in the United States

Notes

Further reading 
 

Slavery in the United States
Antebellum South
19th century in the United States
History of the Southern United States